RRN can refer to:

 Relative record number
 Resident registration number
 Retrieval Reference Number, a key to uniquely identify a card transaction based on the ISO 8583 standard.
 Route reestablishment notification
 Run River North, an indie folk-rock band from Los Angeles, California. 
 Rural Reconstruction Nepal, a social development NGO in Nepal.